Rhabdochaeta formosana is a species of tephritid or fruit flies in the genus Rhabdochaeta of the family Tephritidae.

Distribution
Taiwan.

References

Tephritinae
Insects described in 1933
Diptera of Asia
Diptera of Australasia